Asif Ali Malik (born June 8, 1948) is an Advocate of the Supreme Court of Pakistan and a former Vice-Chairman of the Punjab Bar Council and has also served as a Provincial Parliamentary Secretary for Housing (1997-1999). He is now residing in his family hometown Dhulian, Tehsil Pindigheb.

Education
After getting his early education from Abbottabad Public School, Malik was admitted to the prestigious Government College, Lahore, from where he obtained his bachelor's degree in history and politics. He did his Bachelor in-laws i.e. LLB, from the Punjab University Law College, Lahore.

Career
He started political activities in 1979 at the local level. He was elected as a member of the local union council in 1988 before being elected to the Attock District Council twice. He emerged on the horizon of national politics by winning the General Elections (PP-15, Fateh Jang-Pindigheb) held in the year, 1997. He remained loyal to the party and its leadership during the most testing times of the Benazir Government and of Musharraf's Martial Law. He had to face imprisonment under Maintenance of Public Order during the Tehrik-e-Nijaat launched by PML-N against the then government of Ms. Bhutto. During exile in Saudi Arabia, Mian Nawaz Sharif reposed his confidence in Malik by appointing him as the Additional General Secretary PML-N, Punjab.

Malik also served as a Member Provincial Assembly Punjab from PP-15 (now PP-18, Attock) in 1997 and remained Parliamentary Secretary for Housing and Urban Development Department. He contested for the National Assembly Constituency NA-59 in the 2008 General Elections, however, could not succeed.

He played a leading role in the lawyer's movement for the restoration of the judiciary (2007-2009) and was elected as the Vice-Chairman Punjab Bar Council in the year 2009. Prior to this, he was elected as a Member of the Punjab Bar Council from Attock Seat in the years 2005-2009 and 1995-1999.

Personal life
Asif Ali Malk is married to the sister of PML-N stalwart and leader of the Opposition in the National Assembly Chaudhry Nisar Ali Khan. He has two sons and two daughters.

References

Vice Chairmen of the Punjab Bar Council
Advocates
Pakistani lawyers
Living people
1948 births
People from Attock District
Punjab MPAs 1997–1999